Live in Glasgow may refer to:

 Live in Glasgow (Paul Rodgers album)
 Live in Glasgow (Psychic TV album)
 Live in Glasgow (New Order DVD)